Angeline San Pedro Impelido is a former Filipino international footballer.

Education
Impelido attended Glenbard South High School. She later entered the Northern Illinois University, where she played for the NIU Huskies women's soccer team.

International career
Butchie Impelido, Angeline's father who was an official U.S. scout and recruiter for the Philippine women's team, contacted the team manager Philippine women's team and endorsed his daughter who was the star player of Northern Illinois University at that time. He was told to send a video of Angeline playing football and later asked to go to Manila for try-outs.

Angeline managed to gain a spot at the national team and later played at the 2005 Southeast Asian Games with his younger sister Patrice. She was again called up with her sister to play at the 2007 Southeast Asian Games

She was called up to play for the national team in the 2012 AFF Women's Championship.

Coaching
Impelido became head coach and manager of Illinois-based Hawks White.

Career statistics

International goals
Scores and results list the Philippines' goal tally first.

References

Living people
American sportspeople of Filipino descent
Soccer players from Illinois
Northern Illinois University alumni
Filipino women's footballers
Philippines women's international footballers
American women's soccer players
1980s births
Women's association football forwards
Northern Illinois Huskies women's soccer players